André Matsangaissa (also spelled Matsangaiza) (1950 – 17 October 1979) was a Mozambican anti-communist rebel and the first leader of the Rhodesian-backed Mozambican National Resistance (RENAMO).

Born in Chirara, Mozambique, Matsangaissa joined FRELIMO in 1972, and after FRELIMO's victory in 1975 he became a quartermaster stationed at Dondo, near Beira. He was punished for theft by being expelled from the Mozambican Army (Forças Armadas de Moçambique, FAM) and was placed in a re-education camp at Gorongosa. He was freed during an attack on the camp by Rhodesian forces and was taken to Rhodesia. In 1977 Matsangaissa was appointed by the Rhodesians as leader of the Mozambican National Resistance (RENAMO) in an effort to indigenize the rebel group. Matsangaissa died in a 1979 raid against FRELIMO in Sofala Province, Mozambique.

Former members of RENAMO commemorated his death in Gorongosa on 17 October 1997, although the town administrator rejected their plan to build a tomb in his memory. In June 2007, a municipal roundabout in the city of Beira was renamed after Matsangaissa by the Beira Municipal Assembly, then under the control of RENAMO. In the elections of 2008, FRELIMO reassumed control of the Assembly and attempted to return the roundabout to its old name.

Citations

Sources

 Fauvet, P. (1984) Roots of counter-revolution: the Mozambique National Resistance

Year of birth missing
1979 deaths
Mozambican rebels
Mozambican anti-communists
RENAMO politicians
FRELIMO politicians
Mozambican escapees
Escapees from Mozambican detention